Plants of the World Online recognises about 300 accepted taxa (of species and infraspecific names) in the plant genus Pavonia of the mallow family Malvaceae.

A
 Pavonia achanioides 
 Pavonia alba 
 Pavonia alia 
 Pavonia almasana 
 Pavonia alnifolia 
 Pavonia angustifolia 
 Pavonia angustipetala 
 Pavonia anisaster 
 Pavonia apiculata 
 Pavonia arabica 
 Pavonia arachnoides 
 Pavonia arenaria 
 Pavonia argentina 
 Pavonia aschersoniana 
 Pavonia aschersonioides 
 Pavonia aspera 
 Pavonia atlantica 
 Pavonia aurantia 
 Pavonia aurelii 
 Pavonia aurigloba

B

 Pavonia bahamensis 
 Pavonia baillonii 
 Pavonia balansae 
 Pavonia baumliana 
 Pavonia belophylla 
 Pavonia betonicifolia 
 Pavonia biflora 
 Pavonia blanchetiana 
 Pavonia blepharicarpa 
 Pavonia brevibracteolata 
 Pavonia bullulata 
 Pavonia burchellii

C

 Pavonia cabraliana 
 Pavonia calcicola 
 Pavonia calycina 
 Pavonia calyculosa 
 Pavonia cancellata 
 Pavonia candida 
 Pavonia capivarensis 
 Pavonia castaneifolia 
 Pavonia cauliflora 
 Pavonia chiquitensis 
 Pavonia chlorantha 
 Pavonia ciliata 
 Pavonia clarkii 
 Pavonia clathrata 
 Pavonia coccinea 
 Pavonia cochensis 
 Pavonia columella 
 Pavonia communis 
 Pavonia commutata 
 Pavonia conferta 
 Pavonia corymbosa 
 Pavonia cracens 
 Pavonia crassipedicellata 
 Pavonia crispa 
 Pavonia cristaliana 
 Pavonia cristata 
 Pavonia cristobaliae 
 Pavonia cryptica 
 Pavonia cryptocalyx 
 Pavonia cymbalaria

D

 Pavonia dasypetala 
 Pavonia decora 
 Pavonia dentata 
 Pavonia dimorphostemon 
 Pavonia distinguenda 
 Pavonia domatiifera 
 Pavonia dregei 
 Pavonia ducke-limae 
 Pavonia durangensis 
 Pavonia dusenii

E
 Pavonia ecostata 
 Pavonia ekmanii 
 Pavonia elegans 
 Pavonia ellenbeckii 
 Pavonia eremogeiton 
 Pavonia erythrolema 
 Pavonia eurychlamys 
 Pavonia exasperata

F
 Pavonia falconensis 
 Pavonia filiformis 
 Pavonia firmiflora 
 Pavonia flavispina 
 Pavonia flavoferruginea 
 Pavonia fonsecana 
 Pavonia formosa 
 Pavonia friesii 
 Pavonia friisii 
 Pavonia froesii 
 Pavonia fruticosa 
 Pavonia fryxelliana 
 Pavonia fryxellii

G

 Pavonia gallaensis 
 Pavonia garckeana 
 Pavonia geminiflora 
 Pavonia gentryi 
 Pavonia glazioviana 
 Pavonia glaziovii 
 Pavonia glechomoides 
 Pavonia glutinosa 
 Pavonia goetheoides 
 Pavonia gossweileri 
 Pavonia gracilis 
 Pavonia grandiflora 
 Pavonia graomogoliana 
 Pavonia grazielae 
 Pavonia guerkeana

H

 Pavonia harleyi 
 Pavonia hassleriana 
 Pavonia hastata  – spearleaf swampmallow
 Pavonia hatschbachii 
 Pavonia heterostemon 
 Pavonia heterotricha 
 Pavonia hexaphylla 
 Pavonia hieronymi 
 Pavonia hirticalyx 
 Pavonia hirtiflora 
 Pavonia horrida 
 Pavonia hotteana 
 Pavonia humifusa

I
 Pavonia imatacensis 
 Pavonia immaculata 
 Pavonia immitis 
 Pavonia insperabilis 
 Pavonia integrifolia 
 Pavonia intermedia 
 Pavonia intermixta 
 Pavonia ionthacarpa

K
 Pavonia kearneyi 
 Pavonia kilimandscharica 
 Pavonia kleinii 
 Pavonia kotschyi 
 Pavonia krapovickasii

L

 Pavonia laetevirens 
 Pavonia lanata 
 Pavonia lasiopetala  – Texas swampmallow
 Pavonia latibracteolata 
 Pavonia latifolia 
 Pavonia laxifolia 
 Pavonia leiocarpa 
 Pavonia leptocalyx 
 Pavonia leucantha 
 Pavonia longifolia 
 Pavonia longipedunculata 
 Pavonia longipilosa 
 Pavonia longitricha 
 Pavonia longitudinalis 
 Pavonia luetzelburgii

M

 Pavonia macdougallii 
 Pavonia macrostyla 
 Pavonia makoyana 
 Pavonia malacophylla 
 Pavonia malvaviscoides 
 Pavonia marginata 
 Pavonia martii 
 Pavonia matteiana 
 Pavonia mattogrossensis 
 Pavonia meeboldii 
 Pavonia melhanioides 
 Pavonia missionum 
 Pavonia mollis 
 Pavonia montana 
 Pavonia monticola 
 Pavonia morii 
 Pavonia multiflora 
 Pavonia mutisii

N
 Pavonia nana 
 Pavonia narcissi 
 Pavonia nayarensis 
 Pavonia neei 
 Pavonia nemoralis 
 Pavonia nepetifolia 
 Pavonia nigrescens

O
 Pavonia occhionii 
 Pavonia opulifolia 
 Pavonia orientalis 
 Pavonia ovaliphylla 
 Pavonia oxyphylla 
 Pavonia oxyphyllaria

P

 Pavonia pabstii 
 Pavonia palmeirensis 
 Pavonia paludicola 
 Pavonia paneroi 
 Pavonia paniculata 
 Pavonia papilionacea 
 Pavonia paraensis 
 Pavonia patuliloba 
 Pavonia paucibracteata 
 Pavonia paucidentata 
 Pavonia penduliflora 
 Pavonia peruviana 
 Pavonia piauhyensis 
 Pavonia pilifera 
 Pavonia piptocalyx 
 Pavonia pirottae 
 Pavonia platyloba 
 Pavonia pleuranthera 
 Pavonia pohlii 
 Pavonia praemorsa 
 Pavonia prionophylla 
 Pavonia procumbens 
 Pavonia propinqua 
 Pavonia pseudolaxifolia 
 Pavonia pseudotyphalaea 
 Pavonia psilophylla 
 Pavonia pterocarpa 
 Pavonia pulchra 
 Pavonia pulidoae 
 Pavonia punctata 
 Pavonia purpusii

Q
 Pavonia quadrifida

R

 Pavonia ramboi 
 Pavonia rehmannii 
 Pavonia reitzii 
 Pavonia renifolia 
 Pavonia repens 
 Pavonia restiaria 
 Pavonia reticulata 
 Pavonia revoluta 
 Pavonia rhizophorae 
 Pavonia rhodantha 
 Pavonia rogersii 
 Pavonia rojasii 
 Pavonia rosa-campestris 
 Pavonia rosengurttii 
 Pavonia rotundifolia 
 Pavonia rubra 
 Pavonia rudis 
 Pavonia rupestris

S

 Pavonia sagittata 
 Pavonia salmonea 
 Pavonia sancti 
 Pavonia sapucayensis 
 Pavonia schiedeana 
 Pavonia schimperiana 
 Pavonia schininii 
 Pavonia schrankii 
 Pavonia schwackei 
 Pavonia schweinfurthii 
 Pavonia secreta 
 Pavonia semiserrata 
 Pavonia senegalensis 
 Pavonia sepioides 
 Pavonia sepium 
 Pavonia serrana 
 Pavonia serrata 
 Pavonia setifer 
 Pavonia sidifolia 
 Pavonia somalensis 
 Pavonia spectabilis 
 Pavonia spiciformis 
 Pavonia spinifex 
 Pavonia spinistipula 
 Pavonia spuria 
 Pavonia stenopetala 
 Pavonia steudneri 
 Pavonia stipularis 
 Pavonia stolzii 
 Pavonia striata 
 Pavonia strictiflora 
 Pavonia subhastata 
 Pavonia submutica 
 Pavonia subrotunda

T
 Pavonia tiliifolia 
 Pavonia transvaalensis 
 Pavonia tricalycaris 
 Pavonia triloba 
 Pavonia troyana

U

 Pavonia undulata 
 Pavonia uniflora 
 Pavonia urens

V
 Pavonia vannii 
 Pavonia varians 
 Pavonia velvetiana 
 Pavonia venusta 
 Pavonia vinosa 
 Pavonia viscidula 
 Pavonia viscosa 
 Pavonia vitifolia

W
 Pavonia windischii

X
 Pavonia xanthogloea

Y
 Pavonia yatarendana

Z
 Pavonia zehntneri 
 Pavonia zeylonica

References

Pavonia
Pavonia